The Riverview Covered Pedestrian Bridge is a wooden Pratt truss covered bridge built beneath the Smolen-Gulf Bridge, completed in 2016. It is a Pratt truss design, like the Smolen-Gulf Bridge, and was designed by Smolen Engineering. It sits below Smolen Bridge in Indian Trails Park. It was dedicated on October 4, 2016.

Gallery

See also
List of covered bridges in Ashtabula County, Ohio

References

Covered bridges in Ashtabula County, Ohio
Bridges completed in 2016
Pedestrian bridges in Ohio
Wooden bridges in Ohio
Pratt truss bridges in the United States